"John the Revelator" / "Lilian" is the second double A-side single released by English electronic music band Depeche Mode, issued on 5 June 2006. Both songs are included on Depeche Mode's 11th studio album, Playing the Angel (2005), and served as the fourth single from the album. The single became another UK top-20 hit for the band, reaching number 18. "John the Revelator" was edited down several seconds for the single, while "Lilian" was slightly remixed and the introduction was shortened.

The single is the first UK double A-side release by the band since "Blasphemous Rumours / Somebody" in 1984. "John the Revelator" was played during Depeche Mode's Touring the Angel tour and can be watched on the tour's DVD.

Track listings

7-inch single
 "John the Revelator" (UNKLE dub)
 "Lilian" (Robag Wruhme Slomoschen Kikker)

12-inch single
A1. "John the Revelator" (Dave Is in the Disco Tiefschwarz remix)
AA1. "John the Revelator" (Tiefschwarz dub)
AA2. "Lilian" (Chab dub)

Limited-edition 12-inch single
A1. "John the Revelator" (Murk Mode dub)
AA1. "John the Revelator" (Boosta Club remix)
AA2. "Lilian" (Chab vocal remix)

CD1
 "John the Revelator" (single version) – 3:14
 "Lilian" (single version) – 3:34

CD2
 "John the Revelator" (Dave is in the Disco Tiefschwarz remix) – 7:49
 "John the Revelator" (Murk Mode remix) – 7:13
 "John the Revelator" (UNKLE re construction) – 4:59
 "John the Revelator" (Boosta club remix) – 4:47
 "John the Revelator" (Tiefschwarz dub) – 8:12

DVD single
 "John the Revelator" (video)
 "Nothing's Impossible" (bare—audio)
 "Lilian" (Chab vocal remix—audio)

Charts

References

External links
 Single information from the official Depeche Mode web site
 Allmusic review

Depeche Mode songs
2006 singles
Number-one singles in Denmark
Songs written by Martin Gore
Mute Records singles
Song recordings produced by Ben Hillier